Bastos racing team was a Belgian WRC team from 2001 until 2002 and in 2003 went to ERC. Notable drivers of the team were Bruno Thiry and Kris Princen.

References

World Rally Championship teams
Belgian auto racing teams

Auto racing teams established in 2001
European Rally Championship teams